Sycamore is a name which has been applied to several types of trees, but with somewhat similar leaf forms.  The name derives from the ancient Greek  (sūkomoros) meaning "fig-mulberry".

Species of trees known as sycamore:
 Acer pseudoplatanus, a species of maple native to central Europe and southwestern Asia
 Ficus sycomorus, the sycamore (or sycomore) of the Bible; a species of fig, also called the sycamore fig or fig-mulberry, native to the Middle East and eastern Africa
 Platanus orientalis, chinar tree (Old World sycamore)

 Some North American members of the genus Platanus, including
 Platanus occidentalis, the American sycamore
 Platanus racemosa, the California sycamore or western sycamore
 Platanus wrightii, the Arizona sycamore
 Platanus mexicana. the Mexican sycamore
 In Australia, there are numerous trees which have the common name "sycamore":
 Litsea reticulata or Cryptocarya glaucescens (silver sycamore)
 Polyscias elegans (white sycamore)  
 Cryptocarya obovata (white sycamore)
 Ceratopetalum succirubrum (satin sycamore)
 Cardwellia sublimia
 Cryptocarya hypospodia (bastard sycamore)
 Ceratopetalum virchowii (pink sycamore)
 Ceratopetalum corymbosum (mountain sycamore)

References

Trees